Leucoraja is a genus of hardnose skates in the family Rajidae, commonly known as the rough skates. They occur mostly on continental shelves and slopes in the north-western and eastern Atlantic Ocean, the Mediterranean Sea, the south-western Indian Ocean, and Australia.

Species
 Leucoraja caribbaea (McEachran, 1977) (Maya skate)
 Leucoraja circularis (Couch, 1838) (sandy skate)
 Leucoraja compagnoi (Stehmann, 1995) (tigertail skate)
 Leucoraja erinacea (Mitchill, 1825) (little skate)
 Leucoraja fullonica (Linnaeus, 1758) (shagreen skate)
 Leucoraja garmani (Whitley, 1939) (rosette skate)
 Leucoraja lentiginosa (Bigelow & Schroeder, 1951) (speckled skate)
 Leucoraja leucosticta (Stehmann, 1971) (white dappled skate)
 Leucoraja melitensis (R. S. Clark, 1926) (Maltese skate)
 Leucoraja naevus (J. P. Müller & Henle, 1841) (cuckoo skate)
 Leucoraja ocellata (Mitchill, 1815) (winter skate)
 Leucoraja pristispina Last, Stehmann & Séret, 2008 (sawback skate)
 Leucoraja virginica (McEachran, 1977) (Virginia skate)
 Leucoraja wallacei (Hulley, 1970) (yellow-spotted skate)
 Leucoraja yucatanensis (Bigelow & Schroeder, 1950) (Yucatán skate)

References
 

 
Rajidae
Ray genera
Taxa named by August Wilhelm Malm
Taxonomy articles created by Polbot